"Now or Never" is a song by German recording artist Mark Medlock, the winner of the fourth season of the reality television talent show Deutschland sucht den Superstar, broadcast on RTL in 2007. Serving as both his coronation song and debut single, the song was written and produced by DSDS judge Dieter Bohlen. Released in May 2007, it reached the top of the singles charts in Austria, Germany, and Switzerland.

Formats and track listings

2-Track-Single
 "Now Or Never" (Single Version) 3:14
 "Only A Fool"  3:23

Maxi-Single
 "Now Or Never" (Single Version)  3:14
 "Now Or Never" (Acoustic Version)  3:12
 "Now Or Never" (Instrumental Version)  3:13
 "Only A Fool" 3:34 (D. Bohlen)

Charts

Weekly charts

Year-end charts

Certifications

References

2007 debut singles
Number-one singles in Austria
Number-one singles in Germany
Songs written by Dieter Bohlen
Pop ballads
2007 songs
Sony BMG singles